Susan Yuzna, a native of Minnesota, is an American poet and professor.

Life
She has a B.A. in English from the University of Iowa, and an M.F.A. in creative writing from the University of Montana. She has been resident at several artist colonies, including Yaddo, and MacDowell. She lives in Minneapolis, Minnesota.

Awards
 Bush Artist Fellowship
 Richard Hugo Memorial Poetry Scholarship
 Her Slender Dress, won the Akron Poetry Prize and the Norma Farber First Book Award from the Poetry Society of America.

Works

Poetry Books

References

Year of birth missing (living people)
Living people
American women poets
University of Iowa alumni
University of Montana alumni
University of North Dakota faculty
Writers from Minneapolis
Poets from Minnesota
American women academics
21st-century American women